Cnemaspis salimalii, Salim Ali's dwarf gecko, is a species of diurnal, rock-dwelling, insectivorous gecko endemic to  India.

The species name honours Salim Ali.

References

 Cnemaspis salimalii

salimalii
Reptiles of India
Reptiles described in 2022
Taxa named by Ishan Agarwal
Taxa named by Akshay Khandekar